Mahavir Institute of Engineering and Technology (MIET)  was established in 2001. It is spread over a 102-acre campus . It is located beside the NH-5 and about 8 km. from Bhubaneswar bus-stand towards Khurda. The college is approved by AICTE and affiliated by Biju Patnaik University of Technology. An ISO 9001:2000 Certified college but  Still don't know why the pharmaceutical and B.Tech. building is closed.

History
MIET is a technical institution in the capital city of Odisha, India that runs under the aegis of the Nabajuga Educational and Charitable Trust, Bhubaneswar with the motto to promote technical/professional education in the country. Besides MIET, the trust runs two Pharmacy Colleges, namely Indira Gandhi Institute of Pharmaceutical Sciences (IGIPS), Bhubaneswar, Orissa College of Pharmaceutical Sciences, Dhenkanal and a Diploma Engineering college, namely Orissa Institute of Engineering and Technology (OIET), Dhenkanal.

Courses offered
BTech, MTech, MCA and MBA courses are approved by All India Council for Technical Education (AICTE), New Delhi, recognized by the government of Odisha and affiliated to Biju Patnaik University of Technology (BPUT), Rourkela.

Academics

The institute offers the following undergraduate programs leading to a BTech degree:

The college also offers a 2-year postgraduate degree program in MTech in the following engineering disciplines:

MIET also offers a 2-year master's degree in MBA, 3-year postgraduate degree program in Master of Computer Applications and 3-year BTech degree for diploma holders under the lateral entry scheme with the approval of AICTE New Delhi, recognised by the government of Odisha and affiliated under the Biju Patnaik University of Technology, Rourkela.

References

External links 
 
 MIET Bhubaneswar on facebook

Private engineering colleges in India
All India Council for Technical Education
Engineering colleges in Odisha
Universities and colleges in Bhubaneswar
Science and technology in Bhubaneswar
Colleges affiliated with Biju Patnaik University of Technology
Educational institutions established in 2001
2001 establishments in Orissa